Mirosław Żak - born 10 September 1936 in Katowice (Poland)) surveyor, Professor of technical sciences, Professor of Agricultural University of Kraków (Head of the Department of Geodesy (1991), Head of the Department of Higher Geodesy (1992), Head of the Department of Geodesy (2004-2006).

References

Geodesists
Polish geodesists
1936 births
Living people